"If You Gotta Go, Go Now" (sometimes subtitled "(Or Else You Got to Stay All Night)") is a song written by Bob Dylan in 1964. The first released version was as a single in the US by the UK group the Liverpool Five in July 1965, but this did not chart in the US despite receiving much airplay, particularly in the Pacific Northwest. Another British band, Manfred Mann, then issued the song as a single in September 1965 and had a number 2 hit. Fairport Convention also had a chart hit, with a French version, in 1969.

Dylan's version
Dylan began the recording for "If You Gotta Go, Go Now" on January 13, 1965, during the first session for Bringing It All Back Home. Of the two acoustic takes completed, neither was used. He recorded the song again on January 15, producing four takes with a full band, plus backing vocalist Angeline Butler from the folk trio The Pilgrims. Take 4 was released on The Bootleg Series Volumes 1–3 (Rare & Unreleased) 1961–1991 in 1991, and the sessions are available on The Bootleg Series Vol. 12: The Cutting Edge 1965–1966.

On May 21, 1965, producer Tom Wilson edited together composites of several takes from January 15 and brought in unidentified vocalists to overdub additional backing vocals. This version was released as a single in The Netherlands in 1967, where it failed to chart. 

No Dylan version was released in the US or the UK until the appearance of The Bootleg Series, which, as noted above, featured a different version of the song from the single. The song also appears on The Bootleg Series Vol. 6: Bob Dylan Live 1964, Concert at Philharmonic Hall, albeit in an acoustic, live form.

Additional versions from Dylan's 1965–1966 recording sessions are included on the Deluxe and Collector's Editions of The Bootleg Series Vol. 12: The Cutting Edge 1965–1966.

Manfred Mann version
Another English band, Manfred Mann, then issued the song as a single in September 1965, and that version reached number 2 on the UK charts. Billboard said of the single: "this hard beat Bob Dylan material has all the earmarks of a smash hit that will spiral the group up the charts once again."

Fairport Convention version
Fairport Convention also took the song onto the charts, albeit in an unusual fashion: the group translated the song into French as "Si tu dois partir". Recorded for their Unhalfbricking album, the song was issued as a single in 1969, on the Island label in the UK and on the A&M label in the US. It was the band's only charting single, reaching number 21 and staying in the British Chart for nine weeks.

References

External links
Official lyrics from BobDylan.com
 

Songs written by Bob Dylan
Bob Dylan songs
1964 songs
1965 singles
1969 singles
Fairport Convention songs
Manfred Mann songs
Song recordings produced by Joe Boyd
Columbia Records singles
Island Records singles
A&M Records singles
Songs about parting